Kokia may refer to:
 Kokia (plant), genus of flowering plants in the family Malvaceae
 Kokia (singer), Japanese singer-songwriter
 Uri Kokia (born 1981), basketball player and coach